Telipna transverstigma is a butterfly in the family Lycaenidae. It is found in Cameroon, the northern part of the Republic of the Congo and Gabon.

References

Butterflies described in 1910
Poritiinae